Burnt Peak may refer to:

 Burnt Peak (California)
 Burnt Peak (Montana)
 Burnt Peak (Oregon)
 Burnt Peak (Nevada)
 Burnt Peak (New Mexico)
 Burnt Peak (Utah)
 Burnt Peak (Washington)